The Charlottesville Union Station, located in Charlottesville, Virginia, United States, is served by Amtrak's Cardinal, Crescent, and daily Northeast Regional passenger trains.  It is Amtrak's third-busiest station in Virginia, aside from its all-auto Auto Train station in Lorton. The station is situated in the northeast quadrant of the junction between two railway lines. The Cardinal uses the east–west line, owned by the state of Virginia, and formerly by CSX Transportation, and operated by the Buckingham Branch Railroad, while other services use the north–south line owned and operated by Norfolk Southern Railway. The station is within walking distance of the University of Virginia, which is the major employer in the area.

History 
The original Union Station was built in 1885 to jointly serve the Charlottesville and Rapidan Railroad, the Virginia Midland Railway, and the Chesapeake and Ohio Railway.  Major renovations in 1915 included the construction of a baggage handling facility.

When Amtrak took over most intercity passenger rail service in 1971, the Southern Railway opted to continue running the Southern Crescent itself, at Union Station. The James Whitcomb Riley (later the Cardinal) used Main Street Station to the east, as well as stopping at Union Station until early in 1977. The last train between Charlottesville and Richmond ran on June 14, 1976, when the Amtrak changed the route of the James Whitcomb Riley. Afflicted with rising costs, the Southern Railway relented and turned the Southern Crescent over to Amtrak on February 1, 1979. Amtrak renamed it as the Crescent and made Union Station the Charlottesville stop for the Cardinal as well.

For most of the next three decades, the only trains calling at Charlottesville were the Crescent, which arrived northbound during the morning rush and southbound in the evening, and the thrice weekly Cardinal, which arrived westbound at lunchtime and eastbound before the afternoon rush. In 2009, Amtrak extended a Northeast Regional round-trip to Lynchburg (since extended to Roanoke) by way of Charlottesville.  On July 11, 2022 Amtrak added a second daily round-trip, an afternoon departure of Amtrak's overnight train of the Northeast Corridor, numbers 66/67, the former Night Owl, was added to the Northeast Regional.

Since 1999, the former baggage handling facility is home to the Amtrak ticket office and waiting area. The main facility has been privately developed into the commercial restaurant, Wild Wing Cafe.  Plans coincident with the redevelopment to create a transportation hub at Union Station were not realized. Instead, in 2007 Charlottesville completed the Downtown Transit Center one mile across town.

However, the station does serve as an intermodal transportation nexus, with connecting Amtrak Thruway motorcoach service to Richmond Staples Mill Road station for some trains there, a 200-plus-space parking lot, and access to a Greyhound Lines bus station several blocks away. The Virginia Breeze, a bus service sponsored by the Virginia Department of Rail and Public Transportation, stops a few miles to the west at a shopping center. These services allow Charlottesville travelers to reach various airports and other destinations in the region. The Charlottesville Free Trolley stops just north of the station, and connects Downtown and the University of Virginia.

Out of the twenty-one Virginia stations, Charlottesville is the fourth busiest, according to the FY2018 ridership. This is mainly due to the large number of passengers traveling between this station and Washington, Baltimore and points north.

Future 
In December 2019 the Commonwealth of Virginia purchased CSX Transportation's Buckingham Branch track and right-of-way from Clifton Forge, Virginia to Charlottesville, and onward to Doswell, Virginia, north of Richmond. The western segment hosts the Cardinal, while the eastern segment facilitates future passenger service between Charlottesville and Richmond, as outlined in the 2017 Virginia Statewide Rail Plan. It covers the same route used by the James Whitcomb Riley in 1976. The state is leasing the line to CSX and Buckingham Branch for its current uses.

References

External links 

Charlottesville Amtrak Station (USA RailGuide -- TrainWeb)

Amtrak stations in Virginia
Transportation in Charlottesville, Virginia
Bus stations in Virginia
Railway stations in the United States opened in 1885
Stations along Chesapeake and Ohio Railway lines
Railway stations in Virginia at university and college campuses
Stations along Southern Railway lines in the United States